Trashed, Lost & Strungout is a single and an EP released by the Finnish melodic death metal band Children of Bodom on Spinefarm Records. It was released on 25 October 2004. Unlike most EPs, it was released on CD and DVD. The CD includes 3 other songs and the DVD includes the single and 9 other songs. This track has also appeared in Children of Bodom's album Are You Dead Yet?.

Track listing 
Single

EP - CD

EP - DVD

Personnel
Children of Bodom
Alexi Laiho – vocals, lead guitar
Roope Latvala – rhythm guitar
Janne Wirman – keyboards
Henkka Seppälä – bass guitar
Jaska Raatikainen – drums

Production
Produced and recorded by Anssi Kippo
Mixed by Mikko Karmila
Mastered by Mika "Count" Jussila
Graphic design by Sasu Siikamäki
Band photo by Patric Ullaeus

Chart positions

References 

2004 EPs
Children of Bodom albums
Spinefarm Records EPs
Century Media Records EPs
Century Media Records singles